USS Magnet has been the name of more than one United States Navy ship, and may refer to:

 , a patrol vessel in commission from 1917 to 1919
 , a minesweeper in commission from 1944 to 1945
 , originally USS YDG-9, later ADG-9, a degaussing vessel in commission from 1944 to 1946

United States Navy ship names